Dooly may refer to:

 Dooly (character), the main character from Dooly the Baby Dinosaur
 Dooly Building, Salt Lake City, Utah, United States
 Dooly County, Georgia, United States
 Dooly Southern Railway, a defunct railway in Dooly County
 John Dooly (1740-1780), American soldier